Jalonen is a Finnish surname. Notable people with the surname include:

Jasse Jalonen (born 1973), Finnish football midfielder
Jukka Jalonen (born 1962), Finnish ice hockey coach and former player
Kari Jalonen (born 1960), Finnish ice hockey coach and former player
Olli Jalonen (born 1954), Finnish writer

Finnish-language surnames